First Presbyterian Church is a historic church at 265 Jackson Street in Sandusky, Ohio.

It was built in 1853 and added to the National Register of Historic Places in 1982. As of 2012 it is affiliated with the Presbyterian Church (U.S.A.).

References

External links
Official church website

Presbyterian churches in Ohio
Churches on the National Register of Historic Places in Ohio
Romanesque Revival church buildings in Ohio
Churches completed in 1853
Churches in Erie County, Ohio
National Register of Historic Places in Erie County, Ohio
Churches in Sandusky, Ohio